Nikon (alternatively spelled Nicon) was a proto-Somali ancient coastal emporium in the Horn of Africa. It was described in the 1st century CE Greco-Roman travelogue the Periplus of the Erythraean Sea as being situated in the vicinity of Port Dunford (Bur Gao) in the southern Jubaland region of present-day Somalia.

See also
Sarapion
Maritime history of Somalia

References

Ancient Somalia
City-states
African civilizations
Maritime history of Somalia
Jubaland
Ancient Greek geography of East Africa